Angel's Voice is a mini album by Masami Okui, released on November 22, 2002.

Track listing

Lyrics, composition, arrangement: Masami Okui
White season
Lyrics, composition: Masami Okui
Arrangement: Hiroshi Uesugi

Lyrics: Masami Okui
Composition, arrangement: Kenjiro Sakiya
Angel's Voice
Lyrics: Masami Okui
Composition: Kenji Hayashida
Arrangement: Hiroshi Uesugi

Lyrics, composition: Masami Okui
Arrangement: Ryou Yoshimata
2 years
Lyrics: Masami Okui
Composition, arrangement: Yamachi

Lyrics: Masami Okui
Composition: Monta
Arrangement: Hiroshi Uesugi

Sources
Official website: Makusonia

2002 albums
Masami Okui albums
Christmas albums by Japanese artists